Warner Center is an intercity bus station and former bus rapid transit station in the eponymous commercial development in the Woodland Hills neighborhood of the San Fernando Valley in Los Angeles, California, United States. 

When service began on the Orange Line (now the G Line) in 2005, Warner Center was the western terminus, and the only stop not on the dedicated busway. In 2012 an extension of the Orange Line opened to Chatsworth station, leaving Warner Center on a one-stop stub served by alternate buses.

Service to Warner Center station on the Orange Line ended on June 24, 2018, replaced by a shuttle that stopped in several locations around the Warner Center area before offering passengers a transfer to the G Line at Canoga station, running every 10 minutes. 

The station remains standing as a transit hub for the area and is now served by several other bus lines.

Service

Metro Local: 150, 161, 164, 169, 601
City of Santa Clarita Transit: 791, 796
VCTC Intercity: Conejo Connection

References

External links

Orange Line history
LA Metro - countywide: official website

G Line (Los Angeles Metro)
Los Angeles Metro Busway stations
Woodland Hills, Los Angeles
Public transportation in the San Fernando Valley
Public transportation in Los Angeles
Bus stations in Los Angeles
2005 establishments in California